Strömsund Municipality is a municipality in Jämtland County in northern Sweden. Its seat is located in Strömsund.

The nearest larger city is Östersund, the provincial capital of Jämtland, which is located approximately 100 km to the south.

History
Strömsund Municipality was formed in 1974 through the amalgamation of the former municipalities of Fjällsjö, Frostviken, Hammerdal and Ström. The most populous locality in the area, Strömsund, was chosen as administrative centre, and it also gave its name to the new entity.

Geography
With an area of roughly 12,000 km² (4,500 sq mi), it is the sixth largest in Sweden, and one of the most sparsely populated. The town Strömsund has a municipal population of about 3,500 and is located on the slopes of Ströms vattudal, the river that flows through the town. Among locals, the town itself is usually referred to as Ström or Flata (a reference to the flack slope on which the central parts of the town is built).

Localities
There are seven localities (or urban areas) in Strömsund Municipality:

The municipal seat in bold

Economy

Forest industry has traditionally been an important industry, but today tourism also has an important part. Like the rest of Jämtland, nature is what attracts visitors, with its blend of forests, mountains, lakes and rivers.

The two most visited sights are Hembygdsgården in Strömsund (16,000 visitors) and Hällingsåfallet (12,000 visitors).

Another popular site is the cave Korallgrottan.

References

External links

Strömsund Municipality - Official site
Flata.net - Unofficial site
Nordic Husky Farm - Spring, Summer & Autumn hiking on the banks of Vattudalen lake

Municipalities of Jämtland County